Namur was a county of the Carolingian and later Holy Roman Empire in the Low Countries, a region in northwestern Europe. Its territories largely correspond with the present-day Belgian arrondissement Namur plus the northwestern part of the arrondissement Dinant, both part of the modern province of Namur, and previously part of the French Republican department of Sambre-et-Meuse.

Prehistory to the Roman period 
The city of Namur most likely arose around 'the Champeau', a rocky hill between the Sambre and Meuse rivers. Numerous prehistoric flint weapons have been found in the area. During Roman times, the region around Namur was first mentioned in Julius Caesar's  in the second half of the 1st century BC. To the west of Namur were the Nervii, and to the east the Germani cisrhenani, but it has been suggested that Namur itself may have been home to the Aduatuci who Caesar described as descendants of the Cimbri and Teutons. In Caesar's wars, the Roman legions conquered numerous Belgic cities and settlements. After this defeat, the Belgae and their territory were incorporated into the Roman Empire.

The Medieval period 
The first mention of a region ruled by Namur treated it as a part of the older Lommegau ( or ) in the year 832 in a document by Emperor Louis the Pious. In 992, Emperor Otto III described Albert I as a count of Namur for the first time.

The first count of note was Albert III (1063–1102), who held the office of advocate of the Princely Abbey of Stavelot-Malmedy. Until the start of the 12th century, Namur was threatened by its powerful neighbours Brabant, Hainaut and Liège. Important parts of the county were annexed. The city of Dinant, for example, came into possession of Liège. From the 12th century on, the counts of Namur managed to more or less compensate for the losses they had suffered. Count Godfrey, for example, acquired the county of Longwy, thanks to his marriage with Ermesinde of Luxembourg. The last important figure from the first house that ruled Namur was Henry I (1139–96). After Henry's death, a fierce succession war broke out between Baldwin V, Count of Hainaut, and Henry's daughter Ermesinde. Baldwin V eventually received the county of Namur, while Ermesine received Luxembourg, Laroche and Durbuy. The situation remained more or less stable until 1263. In this year, the count of Namur, Baldwin II of Courtenay, sold his county to the count of Flanders, Guy of Dampierre. The house of Dampierre would rule until 1421, when the county of Namur was sold to the Burgundian duke Philip the Good.

The Burgundian and Habsburg periods 
After the county of Namur was bought by Philip the Good, he integrated it into a large territorial and political union, called the Burgundian Netherlands. From the 15th century on, the Southern Netherlands (and with it the county of Namur) were ruled by the Habsburgs. Under their new rule, the military importance of the city of Namur steadily grew. The Burgundians and Habsburgs strengthened the city and built new walls around it. During the 16th and 17th centuries, the city became an important military stronghold, and was repeatedly besieged for this reason.

The Spanish period 
During the Spanish period (16th and 17th century), Namur received a bishopric's seat. The Spanish king Philip II wanted to turn Namur into a catholic bastion as a bulwark against the rise of Calvinism. Thus, Philip II required several religious orders to establish themselves in Namur. In consequence, the city gained a specific catholic character. Philip II also managed to make considerable reïnforcements to the Citadel of Namur. In 1577, Philip II sent Don Juan of Austria to the Netherlands as the new governor. In Namur, Don Juan received Margaret of Valois (the sister of the French king), and organised a magnificent celebration in her honor.

Troubled times and changing rulers 
Namur has had a crucial military role throughout history. After the Spanish period, the strategically important city was repeatedly besieged. In 1692, the troops of Louis XIV of France took the city after a lengthy and furious siege. Louis and his legendary military engineer Sébastien Le Prestre de Vauban personally oversaw the siege. Three years later, in 1695, William III of Orange retook Namur. But the Dutch occupation did not last long. At the Treaty of Utrecht of 1713, the Southern Netherlands came under the rule of the Austrian house of Habsburg. Though the Austrians ruled over the city, the strategically important citadel remained in the hands of the Dutch. The Austrian rule returned peace and calm to the Netherlands.

The French revolutionists and the United Kingdom of the Netherlands 
In 1790 the county of Namur was one of the founders of the United States of Belgium. In 1794 the revolutionary France occupied Namur, immediately introducing a repressive regime. Namur became part of the French department of Sambre-et-Meuse. The French occupation was abruptly ended following Napoleon's defeat at the Battle of Waterloo in 1815. In the Congress of Vienna that followed, the southern and Northern Netherlands were combined to form the United Kingdom of the Netherlands. In this period, the citadel was again rebuilt and more or less received its present-day looks. The kingdom of the Netherlands would not last long. In 1830 the Belgian Revolution broke out, in which Belgium became independent from the Netherlands. The strategically important bastion of Namur played a decisive role in the battles associated with the Belgian Revolution.

Economic activities 
The economic activities of the County of Namur were diverse. Next to the cultivation of grapes in the river valleys, the agriculture also cultivated flax, that formed the basis of the wool industry. Clay formed the raw materials for the ceramic-production and for the making of molds for the so-called dinanderie, the overall name for the yellow copper brass art objects such as lecterns, candleholders, tableware and others. The metal industry was also important: in the 16th century the mouth of the Meuse (Dinant, Bouvignes, Namur, but also  and Liège) was the central region for metallurgy in the Southern Netherlands. Along the banks of the Meuse, limestone was mined and exported.

See also 
 List of rulers of Namur
 :Category:Counts of Namur

References 

States and territories established in the 980s
States and territories disestablished in 1421
Seventeen Provinces
1420s in the Burgundian Netherlands
Medieval Belgium
Counties of the Holy Roman Empire
County
County